Mahya Dağı (Mahiada) (1031 m) is a mountain peak in Turkey. It is the highest peak of the Strandzha massif (Yıldız Mountains) and also the European part of Turkey.

Gallery

External links
 Mahya Dağı - map 

Mountains of Turkey
Landforms of Kırklareli Province